Rafael Gómez may refer to:

Rafael Gómez Ortega (1882–1960), Spanish bullfighter
Rafael Gómez Nieto (1921–2020), Spanish soldier and veteran
Rafael Gómez (wrestler) (born 1960), Cuban wrestler
Rafe Gomez (born 1960), American business writer and DJ
Rafael Gómez (golfer) (born 1967), Argentine golfer
Rafa Gómez (footballer, born 1974), Spanish football goalkeeper
Rafa Gómez (footballer, born 1983), Spanish football forward
Sijo Gómez (Rafael Emilio Gómez, born 1900), Dominican baseball player

See also
Rafael Gomes (born 1980), Brazilian football defender
Rafaela Gómez (born 1997), Ecuadorian tennis player